In systems analysis, a many-to-many relationship is a type of cardinality that refers to the relationship between two entities, say, A and B, where A may contain a parent instance for which there are many children in B and vice versa.

Data relationships 
For example, think of A as Authors, and B as Books. An Author can write several Books, and a Book can be written by several Authors. In this case the logical primary key for AB is formed from the two foreign keys (i.e. copies of the primary keys of A and B).

In web application frameworks such as CakePHP and Ruby on Rails, a many-to-many relationship between entity types represented by logical model database tables is sometimes referred to as a HasAndBelongsToMany (HABTM) relationship.

Artificial intelligence (AI) presents these relationships in many complex ways, including in areas where healthcare equity factors contribute to biased algorithms.

See also 
 Associative entity
 One-to-one (data model)
 One-to-many (data model)

References

Data modeling